Roald Storsletten (2 September 1915 – 6 February 1991) was a Norwegian newspaper editor.

He was hired in the newspaper Dagbladet in 1940, was promoted to news editor in 1954 and served as chief editor from 1958 to 1980, from 1973 jointly with Arve Solstad, and from 1977 also together with Jahn Otto Johansen.

He chaired the Association of Norwegian Editors from 1966 ro 1971.

References

1915 births
1991 deaths
Norwegian newspaper editors
Dagbladet people
20th-century Norwegian writers
Chairs of the Association of Norwegian Editors